Kiyoko Nomura (17 November 1954 – 17 February 2016) was a Japanese former professional tennis player.

Nomura, a multiple medalist at the 1978 Asian Games, represented the Japan Federation Cup team from 1978 to 1981. She was the singles winner at the All Japan Championships in 1979 and 1981, as well as a five-time national champion in doubles. While competing on the international tour she featured in the main draw of the Australian Open.

See also
List of Japan Fed Cup team representatives

References

External links
 
 
 

1954 births
2016 deaths
Japanese female tennis players
Asian Games medalists in tennis
Asian Games gold medalists for Japan
Asian Games silver medalists for Japan
Asian Games bronze medalists for Japan
Medalists at the 1978 Asian Games
Tennis players at the 1978 Asian Games
20th-century Japanese women